Yimuran Kuerban (born 1 January 1999) is a Chinese footballer.

Career statistics

Club

Notes

References

1999 births
Living people
Chinese footballers
Chinese expatriate footballers
Association football defenders
Serbian First League players
Guangzhou F.C. players
FK Sinđelić Beograd players
Expatriate footballers in the Czech Republic
Chinese expatriate sportspeople in Serbia
Expatriate footballers in Serbia